Hattersley is an area of Tameside, Greater Manchester, England; it is located   west of Glossop and  east of Manchester city centre, at the eastern terminus of the M67. Historically part of Tintwistle Rural District in Cheshire until 1974, it is the site of an overspill estate built by Manchester City Council in the 1960s. Hattersley is an area receiving major regeneration, which includes building new housing and additional retail stores.

History

Construction of the estate

Between 1894 and 1936, Hattersley was a largely rural civil parish in the Tintwistle Rural District in the historical county of Cheshire. In 1936, it was annexed to the municipal borough of Hyde but remained undeveloped. At the beginning of the 1960s, most of the area was purchased by Manchester City Council to build a large overspill estate, which became home to many families rehoused from inner-city slum areas like Gorton. Another similar estate was built in Gamesley. Both these estates consist primarily of council-built houses.

Renewal and privatisation
Regeneration in Hattersley is coordinated by Hattersley Neighbourhood Partnership.
 
The city council transferred control of most of Hattersley's housing stock to Peak Valley Housing Association in 2006 after an attempt to transfer it to the Harvest Housing Group which collapsed when a £20 million gap in funding to refurbish the homes to new housing standards was identified. The transfer brought a £40 million, seven-year improvement plan for existing housing tied to a  £140m investment from a private developer.

Selective demolition has begun to remove some obsolete housing leaving space for redevelopment and investment in education and public services. Seven tower blocks were demolished in 2001. Demolition of some of the 1960s low-rise houses on the estate took place in 2007 and 2008, these houses having deteriorated to a condition where refurbishment was not viable, in spite of these houses being just over 40 years old.

In 2012 a Tesco supermarket was opened, despite residents' concern about extra traffic.

Moors Murders

Moors murderer Myra Hindley and her grandmother Ellen Maybury, together with Hindley's boyfriend Ian Brady, were rehoused in Hattersley from Gorton in 1964 and lived at a new council house in the area – 16 Wardle Brook Avenue – for approximately 12 months until they Hindley and Brady were arrested in October 1965. Brady spent much of his time at the house with Hindley and together they carried out the killings of 10-year-old Lesley Ann Downey and 17-year-old Edward Evans at the house; they had already committed three murders while living in Gorton. The body of Downey was buried on nearby Saddleworth Moor the day after her murder on Boxing Day 1964, It was found in the initial search of the moors nearly a year later, but the body of Edward Evans was found at the house in October 1965 before the couple could dispose of it; the police then found the evidence to link Brady and Hindley to the four earlier murders.

In October 1987, Manchester City Council demolished the house as they could not find tenants willing to live there. The site of the house remains vacant, although the surrounding houses remain standing.

Dale Cregan

On 18 September 2012, drug dealer Dale Cregan made a hoax emergency call to the police from an address in Mottram, luring Police Constables Nicola Hughes, 23, and Fiona Bone, 32, of Greater Manchester Police there by claiming that there had been an incident of criminal damage. When they arrived, he ambushed the constables, shooting them and throwing an M75 hand grenade at them. Both officers were hit by at least eight bullets as Cregan fired 32 shots in 31 seconds. He later turned himself in at Hyde police station and was charged with their murders.

Community and regeneration
Hattersley had a monthly community newspaper, the Hattersley & Mottram Community News, produced by local people; it ceased publication in 2011, after Tameside Council ended its funding. It is home to no. 468 (Hyde and Hatterley) Squadron Air Cadets.

Hattersley is now home to both a brand-new community hub and a library. Many new developments have been important in kick-starting the regeneration of the Hattersley district; these include new housing, a large Tesco Extra superstore and Adventure Longdendale (a trampolining, Laser Quest and play centre). There are also plans for Hattersley Retail Park; this was originally scheduled to open in 2021, but has faced multiple setbacks.

Transport

Hattersley railway station serves the area; it is on the Glossop line between Manchester Piccadilly, Glossop and Hadfield. There is a generally half-hourly service in both directions, operated by Northern Trains.

Bus services are provided by Stagecoach Manchester. There are frequent services to Manchester city centre on route 201.

Notable people
Ricky Hatton, the former two-weight world champion boxer, grew up on the estate.
Lisa Huo, brought up in Hattersley, was a contestant on Big Brother 7.
Shayne Ward, from Hattersley, was on The X Factor.

See also

Listed buildings in Longdendale

References

Geography of Tameside
Areas of Greater Manchester
Manchester overspill estates
History of Manchester
Hyde, Greater Manchester